Allen Township is one of thirteen townships in Noble County, Indiana, United States. As of the 2010 census, its population was 7,134 and it contained 2,933 housing units.

Geography

Cities, towns, villages
 Avilla
 Kendallville (south side)

Unincorporated towns
 Lisbon at 
(This list is based on USGS data and may include former settlements.)

Cemeteries
The township contains Saint Marys Cemetery. Information about decedents buried in this cemetery is available through the Indiana Genealogical Society, Fort Wayne, Indiana. The Lisbon Cemetery is accessed via a private drive off West Lisbon Road. Information about decedents buried in this cemetery is available through the Indiana Genealogical Society, Fort Wayne, Indiana.

Major highways
  Indiana State Road 3
  Indiana State Road 8

School districts
 East Noble School Corporation

Political districts
 Indiana's 3rd congressional district
 State House District 52
 State Senate District 13

References
 
 United States Census Bureau 2008 TIGER/Line Shapefiles
 IndianaMap

External links
 Indiana Township Association
 United Township Association of Indiana
 City-Data.com page for Allen Township

Townships in Noble County, Indiana
Townships in Indiana